Loevestein Castle is a medieval castle in the municipality of Zaltbommel, Gelderland, the Netherlands.

The castle  was built by the knight Dirk Loef of Horne (hence "Loef's stein" (stone) house)  between 1357 and 1397. Until World War II Loevestein Castle was part of the Hollandic Water Line, the main Dutch defense line that was based on flooding an area of land south and east of the western provinces. Currently the castle is used as a medieval museum and function centre.

History

Loevestein is a water castle that was built between 1357 and 1368. It was built in a strategic location in the middle of the Netherlands, where the Maas and Waal rivers come together (just west of current day villages of Poederoijen and Brakel, in the municipality of Zaltbommel, in Gelderland). At first it was a simple square brick  building, used to charge toll from trading vessels using the rivers. By 1372, the castle was under control of the Counts of Holland. In the 16th century (around 1575, orders given by William the Silent) it was expanded to a larger fortress surrounded by earthen fortifications with two (later  three) stone bastions on the northern side, two moats, an arsenal, and housing for a commander and soldiers. The Castle was also part of the Hollandic Water Line.

It changed hands twice between the Northern Dutch and the Spanish during the Eighty Years' War: on December 9, 1570, it was taken by the Geuzen; ten days later by the Spanish again; and on June 25, 1572, it was retaken by the Dutch.

From 1619 the castle became a prison for political prisoners. One famous inmate was the eminent lawyer, poet and politician Hugo de Groot (Hugo Grotius) often presented as the "father of modern international law",  who was serving a controversially imposed life sentence from 1619. In 1621, his wife Maria van Reigersberch, who was also staying at the castle, hid with him in a book chest that was regularly brought for them. He subsequently became the Swedish Ambassador to France for 10 years. Another high-profile inmate was the English Vice-Admiral George Ayscue.

In literature
In Alexandre Dumas, père's novel La Tulipe Noire, the main character Cornelius Van Baerle is imprisoned at Loevestein.

See also
List of castles in the Netherlands
Loevestein faction

Gallery

References

Works cited

External links

  
Loevestein Castle home page

Buildings and structures completed in 1397
Houses completed in the 14th century
Historic house museums in the Netherlands
Military and war museums in the Netherlands
National museums of the Netherlands
Castles in Gelderland
Museums in Gelderland
Rijksmonuments in Gelderland
Zaltbommel
Hugo Grotius